Arco de los Blanco is an archway of the Castillo de la Villa  in Cádiz, southern Spain. It has been declared a Bien de Interés Cultural site.

References

See also 
 List of Bien de Interés Cultural in the Province of Cádiz

Bien de Interés Cultural landmarks in the Province of Cádiz
Buildings and structures in Cádiz
Arches and vaults in Spain